The Alexandria Hotel and Annex, also known as Plaza Hotel and Annex, is located at 840-844 Brown St. in Napa, California. Built in 1910, the hotel was a work of architect William H. Corlett. The hotel's design exemplifies the Mission Revival and Mediterranean Revival styles, which were both popular in California in the early 20th century. The design features three square towers on the street facing corners, overhanging eaves, and both slanted bay and rounded windows. The hotel's annex is older than the hotel and was redesigned to match the hotel's architecture when the hotel was built.

The hotel was listed on the National Register of Historic Places in 1982. The listing included two contributing buildings, the hotel and its annex.

2014 Napa Valley earthquake

The building was damaged by the 2014 South Napa earthquake, and has been renovated.

References

Mission Revival architecture in California
Hotel buildings completed in 1910
Buildings and structures in Napa County, California
National Register of Historic Places in Napa County, California